KCKJ (89.5 FM The Wind) is a Christian radio station licensed to Sarcoxie, Missouri, United States, serving the Joplin, Missouri area. The station is an affiliate of KWND broadcasting a Christian Contemporary Music format, and is currently owned by Radio Training Network, Inc.

History
The station began broadcasting in August 2009, and initially held the call letters KITG. KITG was owned by Calvary Chapel Joplin until May 8, 2012, and aired a format consisting of Christian talk and teaching and Christian music. The station adopted the call letters KCKJ on May 18, 2012. Effective August 23, 2018, the station was sold by Lake Area Educational Broadcasting Foundation to Radio Training Network, Inc., as a purchase price of $135,000

References

External links
KCKJ's website
 

CKJ
Radio stations established in 2009
2009 establishments in Missouri